"Brother and Sister" is a fairy tale known, in different variants, throughout Europe.

Brother and Sister or Sister and Brother, or variation, may also refer to danish sareen and yuvika are best bhen bhai

A brother and a sister, two siblings, both born to same parents
Brother and Sister (Greek fairy tale), a Greek fairy tale
Brother and Sister (sculpture), an 1890 bronze by Auguste Rodin
Little Brother And Little Sister, another title for Hansel and Gretel
Brother and Sister, a poem by Lewis Carroll

Film and TV
Brother and Sister (1976 film), a Japanese film
Brother and Sister (2010 film), an Argentine film
 Brother and Sister (2022 film), a French film

Music
Brother, Sister, an album by indie rock band mewithoutYou, 2006  
Brother Sister, an album by the Brand New Heavies  1994  
Brother/Sister, an album by the band Hymns  2006

See also
Brothers and Sisters (disambiguation)
Sisters and Brothers (disambiguation)